The Ferrovie dello Stato Italiane (FS; Italian State Railways) Class 691 is a class of 4-6-2 'Pacific' locomotives; they were the fastest and most powerful locomotives ever built for the Italian railways.

Origin
By the end of the 1920s the FS were considering the possibility of building a new class of Pacific locomotives for mainline express duties; the existing Class 690 ones were poor steamers (because of the small firebox) and therefore not being successful (with the much lighter Class S.685 2-6-2 locomotives having the same performance as them). This class, which should have been the Class 695, would have had however a very high axle load (as much as 21 t), which would have required strengthening of the lines they were supposed to serve; as electrification was becoming more and more prominent, such an expense was considered unwarranted. Therefore, a less ambitious plan, which involved rebuilding the Class 690 locomotives (and which would have entailed a lower axle load), was approved.

The boiler of the Class 690 was replaced by the one fitted on the Class 746 locomotives; the trailing axle was replaced by a Bissel truck, to sustain the weight of the new, larger firebox, and a Nielebock-Knorr pre-heater was added. The 33 locomotives were rebuilt, part by the FS workshops, and part by the Ernesto Breda company.
Initially, they would have received the same tender designed for the Class 695, but in the end an enlarged version of the standard FS bogie tender was fitted.

Operation
The Class 691 served on the Milan-Bologna (up to 1938, when the line was electrified) and the Milan-Venice mainlines throughout their careers, pulling the heaviest and fastest express trains. Three of them were destroyed or irreparably damaged in the years of World War II. After the electrification of the Milan-Venice railway in the spring of 1957, some locomotives remained active for some time on the Venice-Cervignano del Friuli line, but by the early 1960s they were all withdrawn.

Modifications
In 1939, the 691.026 was given a streamlined casing, which was unsuccessful; by 1946 the casing had already been removed.

In 1943, the 691.004 was fitted with a smoke deflector with bad results.

Preservation
Only one locomotive of the class survived into preservation, the 691.022, which is a static exhibit at the Museo della Scienza e della Tecnologia "Leonardo da Vinci" in Milan.

References

 
 

691
4-6-2 locomotives
Breda locomotives
Railway locomotives introduced in 1928
Standard gauge locomotives of Italy
2′C1′ h4 locomotives
Passenger locomotives